Sijunjung Regency, formerly known as Sawahlunto Sijunjung, is a regency (kabupaten) in West Sumatra, Indonesia. The Regency covers an area of 3,130.80 km2, and it had a population of 201,823 at the 2010 census and 235,045 at the 2020 Census. The regency seat is the town of Muaro Sijunjung. The regency was created from the former Sawahlunto Regency, after the districts comprising Sawahlunto town became a city, administratively separated from the regency.

Most of the people work in trade or as government employees, and the rest are farmers. There are few university graduates, because most people are not interested in continuing their studies for reasons of economic and environment culture. Many of the natural resources of this regency are not explored and utilized because of the mountainous geography.

Administrative districts
The Sijunjung Regency is divided into eight districts (kecamatan), listed below with their areas and populations at the 2010 Census and 2020 Census. The table also includes the locations of the district administrative centres.

References

External links 
  Official website

regencies of West Sumatra